Baicalin-beta-D-glucuronidase (baicalinase) is an enzyme with systematic name 5,6,7-trihydroxyflavone-7-O-beta-D-glucupyranosiduronate glucuronosylhydrolase. This enzyme catalyses the following chemical reaction

 baicalin + H2O  baicalein + D-glucuronate

The enzyme also hydrolyses wogonin 7-O-beta-D-glucuronide and oroxylin 7-O-beta-D-glucuronide with lower efficiency.

References

External links 
 

EC 3.2.1